Last Kung Fu Monk is a Chinese martial art drama from 2010 that was filmed and co worked with both China and United States. The movie is the debut directing by Peng Zhang Li, and the story is inspired by his own life as a monk and his new life in a foreign land.

Plot
As a child, young Li Long get separated from his brother. Later he get abandoned in the forest where a shaolin monk save him and let him become a shaolin. Years goes by and Li Long receive information of his brothers whereabouts. When Li Long discover his brother has died in a car crash with his wife, and he now has a nephew that is all alone in New York, he choose to abandon his life as a monk and move to United States of America. Once in America he befriended the social worker Sarah who has taken care of his Nephew Michael. He also meet Dave, who is an admire of shaolin, and help Li Long to open a Kung Fu School. But what Li Long doesn't know is a Russian Mafia leader by the name Oleg has borrowed money to Dave and wants the money back. But after Li Long interrupted a match in his fight club, Oleg has given the monk two choices, one is fight for him in the club or he kidnap his student Mei. No longer a peaceful monk but a fighter of the most dark and brutal combat ever seen.

Cast
 Peng Zhang Li as Li Long
 Kristen Dougherty as Sarah
 Justin Morck as Dave
 Major Curda as Michael
 Kate Forsaz as Emily
 Jonathan Sollis as Officer Cusamano
 Johan Karlberg as Oleg
 Hu Sang as Mei
 Bing Lei Li as Lam
 Eric Yang as Mei's Brother
 Stephanie Yang as Mei's Sister
 Cindy Carino as Mafia Girlfriend

References

Article written by Phil Mills
Article from Movie Mavericks
Article written by World Film Geeks

External links

 
 

Chinese martial arts films
Films set in China
American martial arts films
2010s American films